Nunnally Hunter Johnson (December 5, 1897 – March 25, 1977) was an American screenwriter, film director, producer, and playwright. As a filmmaker,  he wrote the screenplays to more than fifty films in a career that spanned from 1927 to 1967. He also produced more than half of the films he wrote scripts for, and directed eight of those movies. In 1940 he was nominated for the Academy Award for Best Adapted Screenplay for  The Grapes of Wrath, and in 1956 he was nominated for the Directors Guild of America Award for Outstanding Directing – Feature Film for The Man in the Gray Flannel Suit. Some of his other notable films include Tobacco Road (1941), The Moon Is Down (1943), Casanova Brown (1944), The Keys of the Kingdom (1944), The Woman in the Window (1944), The Mudlark (1950),  The Desert Fox: The Story of Rommel (1951), My Cousin Rachel (1952), The Three Faces of Eve (1957), Mr. Hobbs Takes a Vacation (1962), and The Dirty Dozen (1967). As a playwright he wrote the books for several Broadway musicals, including the musical revue Shoot the Works (1931), Arthur Schwartz's  Park Avenue (1946), Bob Merrill's Henry, Sweet Henry (1967), and Jule Styne's Darling of the Day (1968). He also wrote the 1943 Broadway play The World's Full of Girls.

Biography

Early life
Nunnally Johnson was born on December 5, 1897 in Columbus, Georgia, the elder of two sons born to Johnnie Pearl (née Patrick) and James Nunnally Johnson. He and his younger brother, Cecil Patrick Johnson, were raised in Columbus. Their father was a journeyman mechanic, turned tinsmith and coppersmith, turned pipe and sheetmetal shop superintendent for the Central of Georgia Railway. His mother founded what later became the PTA in Columbus, and was the first woman to serve on the Muscogee County Board of Education. Johnson Elementary School in Columbus was built and named for her in 1949.  

Nunnally graduated from Columbus High School in 1915. While living in Columbus in 1919, at 1312 Third Street, Nunnally was a second lieutenant in the field artillery reserve corps. His brother Cecil graduated from Georgia Tech in 1924, married Gene Clair Norris, and moved to Bellingham, Washington, where he was first a gas department superintendent and later a vice president with Puget Sound Power & Light.

Career
Johnson began his career as a journalist, writing for the Columbus Enquirer Sun, the Savannah Press, the Brooklyn Daily Eagle, the New York Evening Post and the New York Herald Tribune. He also wrote short stories, and a collection of these stories, titled There Ought to Be a Law, was published in 1930. His first connection with film work was the sale of screen rights to one of his stories in 1927. Johnson asked his editor if he could write film criticism in 1932. When this request was denied, he decided to move to Hollywood and work directly in the film industry.

Finding work as a scriptwriter, Johnson was hired full-time as a writer by 20th Century-Fox in 1935. He began producing films as well and co-founded International Pictures in 1943 with William Goetz. Johnson also directed several films in the 1950s, including two starring Gregory Peck. He was nominated for the Academy Award for Best Screenplay in 1940 for The Grapes of Wrath and the Directors Guild of America Best Director Award in 1956 for The Man in the Gray Flannel Suit. In 1964, Johnson adapted his daughter Nora Johnson's novel, The World of Henry Orient, into a film of the same title, starring Peter Sellers.

Personal life
His first marriage in 1919 at Trinity Church in Brooklyn Heights, was to Alice Love Mason, with whom he had one daughter, film editor Marjorie Fowler. Mason was an editor with the Brooklyn Daily Eagle. Mason and Johnson divorced in 1920. His second marriage was to Marion Byrnes in 1927, also a staff member of the Daily Eagle, with whom he also had a daughter, Nora Johnson. Byrnes's and Johnson's marriage ended in 1938.

While filming The Grapes of Wrath, Johnson met his third wife, actress Dorris Bowdon, a Mississippi native. The two were married at the home of Charles MacArthur and Helen Hayes in Nyack-on-the-Hudson on February 4, 1940. They had three children. They resided in a mansion located at 625 Mountain Drive in Beverly Hills, California. It was designed by architect Paul R. Williams.

Actor Jack Johnson is his grandson.

Death
Johnson died of pneumonia in Hollywood in 1977 and was interred in the Westwood Village Memorial Park Cemetery in Los Angeles.

Filmography

* Writer of original story** Uncredited writer***Co-producer

Bibliography
 Manchel, Frank. (1990). Film Study: An Analytical Bibliography. In Chapter 5 Comparative Literature. Fairleigh Dickinson Univ Press. p. 1252. . Google Book Search. Retrieved on March 11, 2009.
 

References

External links

 

Nunnally Johnson Collection (MC 255) at Columbus State University Archives

1897 births
1977 deaths
Writers from Columbus, Georgia
People from Beverly Hills, California
American male screenwriters
American dramatists and playwrights
Film producers from California
Burials at Westwood Village Memorial Park Cemetery
Deaths from pneumonia in California
Film directors from California
Film directors from Georgia (U.S. state)
Screenwriters from California
Screenwriters from Georgia (U.S. state)
20th-century American male writers
20th-century American screenwriters